The 1963 Big Ten Conference football season was the 68th season of college football played by the member schools of the Big Ten Conference and was a part of the 1963 NCAA University Division football season.

The 1963 Illinois Fighting Illini football team, under head coach Pete Elliott, won the Big Ten football championship with a record of 8–1–1, defeated Washington in the 1964 Rose Bowl, and was ranked No. 3 in the final AP Poll. Illinois center Dick Butkus received the Chicago Tribune Silver Football award as the most valuable player in the conference and was a consensus first-team All-American.

The 1963 Michigan State Spartans football team, under head coach Duffy Daugherty, compiled a 6–2–1 record, finished in second place in the conference, led the conference in scoring defense (7.0 points allowed per game), and was ranked No. 10 in the final AP Poll. Halfback Sherman Lewis was a consensus first-team All-American and finished third in the voting of the 1963 Heisman Trophy.

The Big Ten's statistical leaders included Tom Myers of Northwestern with 1,398 passing yards, Tom Nowatzke of Indiana with 756 rushing yards, and Paul Krause of Iowa with 442 receiving yards. Carl Eller of Minnesota was the first Big Ten player selected in the 1964 NFL Draft with the sixth overall pick.

Season overview

Results and team statistics

Key
AP final = Team's rank in the final AP Poll of the 1963 season
AP high = Team's highest rank in the AP Poll throughout the 1963 season
PPG = Average of points scored per game
PAG = Average of points allowed per game
MVP = Most valuable player as voted by players on each team as part of the voting process to determine the winner of the Chicago Tribune Silver Football trophy; trophy winner in bold

Preseason
There were no changes in the conference's head football coaches between the 1962 and 1963 seasons.

Regular season

Bowl games

On January 1, 1964, Illinois defeated Washington, 17–7.

Post-season developments
On December 14, 1963, Ara Parseghian resigned as Northwestern's head football coach to accept the same position at Notre Dame.

Statistical leaders

The Big Ten's individual statistical leaders for the 1963 season include the following:

Passing yards

Rushing yards

Receiving yards

Total yards

Scoring

Awards and honors

All-Big Ten honors

The following players were picked by the Associated Press (AP) and/or the United Press International (UPI) as first-team players on the 1963 All-Big Ten Conference football team.

All-American honors

At the end of the 1963 season, Big Ten players secured three of the consensus first-team picks for the 1963 College Football All-America Team. The Big Ten's consensus All-Americans were:

Other Big Ten players who were named first-team All-Americans by at least one selector were:

Other awards

The Heisman Trophy was awarded to Roger Staubach of Navy.  Two Big Ten players finished among the top 10 in the voting for the trophy. They were: Michigan State running back Sherman Lewis (third); and Illinois center/linebacker Dick Butkus (sixth).

1964 NFL Draft
The following Big Ten players were among the first 100 picks in the 1964 NFL Draft:

References